The discography of Shila Amzah, a Malaysian singer-songwriter consists of sixth studio albums including her debut Chinese-language studio album and with numerous singles.

References

Discographies of Malaysian artists
Discography